Nothobranchius aff. taeniopygus is a species of fish in the family Aplocheilidae. It is endemic to Uganda.  Its natural habitat is rivers.

Sources
 Twongo, T.K. & Hanssens, M. 2004.  Nothobranchius aff. taeniopygus.   2006 IUCN Red List of Threatened Species.   Downloaded on 4 August 2007.

Nothobranchius
Endemic fauna of Uganda
Fish of Uganda
Taxonomy articles created by Polbot
Undescribed vertebrate species